Loricaria parnahybae is a species of catfish in the family Loricariidae. It is native to South America, where it occurs in coastal rivers of Brazil and French Guiana. It is typically found in environments characterized by a sandy substrate. The species reaches 16 cm (6.3 inches) in standard length and is believed to be a facultative air-breather.

Loricaria parnahybae appears in the aquarium trade, where it is often referred to as the Parnahyba whiptail.

References 

Loricariidae
Fish described in 1907